Aurelie Felix is a French athlete, born 26 March 1979 at Mont-Saint-Aignan, of height 5.9 ft (1.80 m) and weight 136.6 lbs (62 kg), a graduate of the ASPTT Rouen, and a specialist in the long jump.

Prize list  
  Record holder of France Under 21s in 1999 with 6.85 m (EC hopes Gothenburg – Personal best)
   European champion in 1999 Under 21s
   European champion Juniors in  1997
  15th  IAAF World Championships in Seville in 1999
 17th IAAF World Championships in Edmonton in 2001
 8th Universiade in Beijing in 2001
   Champion of France Elite Long jump in 2000, 2001, 2002 and 2003
  Champion of France Indoors in 2001 and 2002, (3rd in 2004)
  Meeting International du Pas-de-Calais in 1999
  Meeting International Golden League in Brussels and Monaco in 1999
  Meeting at Riviere-Pilote (Martinique ) in 2001
  Meeting at Noisy-le-Grand 2003
  Meeting at Pierre-Benite in 2003, etc.
   bronze medal at the European Championships Under 21s in 2001
 Formerly a specialist in the high jump 1.80 m as a cadette

External links  
 

1979 births
Living people
French female long jumpers